Lifespan is a video game written by John O'Neill for the Atari 8-bit family which was published on cartridge by Roklan in 1983. It was released on disk in 1985 by Antic Software.

Gameplay
Lifespan is a slow-paced and surrealistic pastiche of five episodes.

Reception
George Kopp for Electronic Fun with Computers & Games said "As it stands, Lifespan'''s gameplay doesn't quite live up to expectations (or Expectations). I think it will have a lot of fans, though, and if you're looking to buy your shrink a birthday present, consider it."

References

External links
Review in Electronic Games1984 Software Encyclopedia from Electronic GamesReview in Video GamesReview in Videogaming and Computer Gaming Illustrated''

1983 video games
Art games
Atari 8-bit family games
Atari 8-bit family-only games
Life simulation games
Video games developed in the United States